The 2015 season was Kedah FA's 5th season in the Malaysia Premier League since its inception in 2004. They also participated in the  Malaysia FA Cup and the Malaysia Cup.

Players

Squad information 

Last update: 28 November 2016Source: Facebook Kedah FAOrdered by squad number.

In

Out

Technical staff

Competitions

Overall

Overview

Premier League

The league will kick-off on 6 February and ends on 21 August 2015.

League table

Results summary

Results by round

Fixtures and results

First leg

Second leg

Results overview

As of matches played on 21 August 2015.

FA Cup
The tournament will kick-off on 1 February 2015.

Knockout phase

Malaysia Cup
The tournament will kick-off on 25 August 2015.

Group stage

Knockout phase

Quarter-finals

Semi-finals

Final

References 

Kedah
Kedah Darul Aman F.C.
Kedah Darul Aman F.C. seasons